The NetBeans platform can be extended by adding different plug-ins, for example:

 Oracle Solaris Studio, formerly Sun Studio, is an IDE based on NetBeans, focusing on the C, C++, and Fortran programming languages.
 Poseidon for UML
 Fantom IDE is an IDE for the Fantom language based on the NetBeans Platform. It provides out-of-the-box support for Fantom and for Java, Javascript, CSS, HTML, XML, Subversion, and Mercurial.
 JSwat is a stand-alone, graphical Java debugger front-end.
 blue is a music composer on top of Csound.
 jPlay is an open-source desktop application for managing and playing music.
 JFugue Music NotePad is an open-source project aiming to provide a simple stand-alone application for composing music and generating MIDI files visually.
 JSound is a free project to provide an expert player of sound with 31 bands of equalizer and others features.
 Music IDE is an application that helps children to learn to program.
 ThinkingRock
 Oracle Java VisualVM is a lightweight visual tool that combines a variety of existing JDK software tools for application profiling and monitoring.
 Fiorano Studio
 Visual Acorn is a bioinformatics project on the NetBeans Platform.
 NATO MICE Console (MASE Integrated Console Environment) is the platform at the heart of a redeveloped MASE (Multi-AEGIS Site Emulator) console. MASE is the standard NATO system to support the execution of air operations in a real-time environment.
 Northrop Grumman Agile Client is a NetBeans Platform application developed by Northrop Grumman in partnership with the US Defense Information System Agency. It brings the war fighter a 3-D common operational picture (COP) workstation designed for greater efficiency and mission effectiveness.
 US Navy JECP System Performance Model: Created by the US Navy, the objective of the JECP System Performance Model (SPM) is to model the collective protection performance of each JECP shelter and predict the level of exposure to chemical and biological (CB) agents experienced by personnel inside the toxic-free area (TFA). Exposure within the TFA can occur as a result of agent infiltration through barrier materials, air locks, closures, seams, filters, and from personnel entering or exiting the TFA.
 US Navy JMAT Visualization: Created by the US Navy, the JMAT Visualization Package software lets analysts "playback" a scenario to view how contaminants move externally and internally. This visualization, coupled with various reports and plots, helps the user determine the overall performance of JECP shelters, air locks, and other components when faced with a variety of attacks, configurations, and environmental conditions.
 Data Link Reference System, by South Africa's Saab Systems Grintek, is a tool for determining interoperability compliancy of tactical messaging for the South African National Defence Force (SANDF). This includes scenario generation, a tactical GIS, and message compliancy validation.
 Tactical Geographical Information System, by South Africa's Saab Systems Grintek, is based on a C3I system product developed for the South African Navy (SAN) for an Operational Boat Squadron (OBS) base camp. The TGIS component has now been ported onto the KITT platform as a NetBeans module.
 Saab Symmetry, by South Africa's Saab Systems Grintek, is a generic analysis tool for determining interoperability between nodes on a tactical network.
 Saab Komposer, by South Africa's Saab Systems Grintek, is a tool used to define message sets used by the KORE, which is Saab System Grintek's development platform.
 Master Event List Tool (MELT), by South Africa's Saab Systems Grintek, is a one-way communication system for Conflict Simulation (ConSim), where it is used during simulation exercises.
 European Union Odyssey project, which is part of the European Commission's research funding programme called Framework 7 (FP7), is building a prototype platform to let police forces and other law enforcement agencies easily share data about incidents of ballistic crime. Such data might include the details of individual bullets, spent cartridge cases, or the location of a crime.
 Raytheon Virtual Control is a flexible enterprise management and control system that has been designed to support a wide range of distributed system needs. Its robust capabilities are being applied across the LVC domains to support some of the most critical development programs in the Department of Defense (DoD). 
 NetScene in MOSART Research Testbed, MOSART is a framework for integration, testing, visualization, and evaluation of research results relating to surveillance data. The primary goal of MOSART is to simplify the integration of research results and other advanced functionality into larger simulations and demonstrators.
 ASTRAD, which stands for architecture and simulation tool for radar analysis and design, is a software platform for radar techniques. It provides users with all the functions needed to model, simulate, and design radar systems. Launched as a joint project between French Ministry of Defence and the radar industry community, the ASTRAD software has the ambition to stand out as a reference platform for engineering and scientific applications.
 Trainable Automated Forces (TAF), by Sandia National Laboratories, are computer-generated agents that mimic tactics demonstrated by human experts. Although the goal of TAF is to interact with users mainly through the 3-D virtual environment provided by a training simulator, TAF also relies on a conventional GUI implemented on the NetBeans Platform. 
 Cognitive Architect is a prototype NetBeans Platform application developed by the Cognitive Systems group at Sandia National Laboratories to interactively construct or learn sophisticated information-flow-processing models from relevant data, using the open-source Cognitive Foundry.
 Modular Unix-based Vulnerability Estimation Suite (MUVES) is a modeling and simulation environment for measuring how much damage bullets, bombs and other projectiles can do to vehicles, among other uses. 
 Boeing Mass Properties Toolkit (MassTk) is an engineering analysis application by Boeing. It incorporates the functionality from several legacy mass properties analysis applications that were originally written in Java, Fortran, C, and even Perl.
 The Boeing Shared Platform (BSP)
 Boeing Composite Material Analyzer is used for composite material analysis.
 Boeing Cross-Sectional Structural Analyzer is an application for cross-sectional structural analysis, where users look at a part and determine what size it must be to hold its load.
 Sintez KSA ATC Client is an air traffic control system on the NetBeans Platform for tracking hundreds of flights using primary and secondary surveillance radars.
 Total Airport Management Suite
 Crystal
 Sohard Berne Train Station Management is a passenger information system used at, among others, Berne train stations. It centralizes the control of train schedules and train station doors.
 AirIT Flight Information System is a commercial offering aimed at providing airports with an efficient means of managing their operations. It is used by airport personnel to plan for and manage flights of all types, airport usage (such as concourses, terminals, gates, ticket counters), and flight schedules, among other information.
 AirIT Local Departure Control System
 Ordina Rotterdam Harbor Manager is a prototype application to monitor & manage Rotterdam harbor in the Netherlands.
 Lynden Freight Management, developed by Lynden Freight Shipping & Logistics in Seattle, serves a dual purpose as both a planning and freight tracking tool.
 CoreFreight, developed by Core Freight Systems in South Africa, is an operations support system for Freight Forwarders and Customs Clearing operators.
 Solutions SCM Desk by Sistemas Aereos is an internal application for controlling logistics operations. It controls purchase orders for clients, international transit, customs, as well as delivery of cargo.
 Icasim Weight and Balance is an application based on NetBeans Platform to calculate the centre of gravity of tactical aircraft (e.g. F/A-18) during test-flights.
 Station Simulator GUI has as its main purpose to the monitor and control instruments in In-Orbit Testing earth stations. The rack-like layout, drag&drop, and shuffle features give the operator a visual impression, while looking at the real instruments in the control room's rack.
 Satellite Test Cockpit gives control over the complete In-Orbit-Test-System.
 Satellite Performance Measurement System (SAPMES) is a system deployed on transportable earth stations. Those stations are used for measurement of satellite parameters on various locations, e.g., borders of footprints.
 TLMCore Remote Configuration is responsible for the remote configuration of telemetry servers (TLMCores).
 Vinland Software Suite
 enSuite by Elster is software for parameterization and maintenance of new Elster gas meters, such as the EK280 volume converter, flow computer FC1 and ultrasonic meter Q.Sonic-plus.
 Netinium NCC is the operator console for the Netinium AMM+ platform, a Head End system for multi-vendor smart meter and smart grid infrastructures.
 Trimp (Transmission Pipeline Integrity Management Program) is an application created for Southwest Gas for pipeline engineering.
 Limits is a reservoir engineering tool created by Object Reservoir for shale gas and unconventional reservoirs.
 OffSim Rig Crane Simulation Instructor, by the Offshore Simulator Center, is designed for training personnel that are required to operate cranes on board oil rigs and oil platforms.
 IMS Synapse Tools, by the Institute of Mine Seismology, is software for monitoring and control of the seismic system (communicates RESTfully with Synapse Server).
 IMS Ticker 3D, by the Institute of Mine Seismology, provides a live view of seismic systems and current seismicity.
 IMS Trace, by the Institute of Mine Seismology, provides seismological processing and analysis of seismograms (calculates location and magnitude of seismic events).
 IMS Insight4D
 Pyrus is an application in the petroleum engineering domain. It provides a user interface for displaying and evaluating the results of seismic algorithms.
 Power Plant HIL Simulator by Marine Cybernetics in Norway performs independent testing and verification of computer system software to detect and eliminate errors and weaknesses in power generators on ships, using Hardware-In-the-Loop (HIL) testing technology.
 INTViewer, by Interactive Network Technologies, Inc., is a visualization application for analysis and quality control of geoscience data. It is also a development platform that can be extended with Java and Python.
 studioSL by StreamSim Technologies, Inc. allows to preprocess and post-process data from different oil reservoir simulators. It contains 3DSL, a flow simulator based on streamlines.
 Gemcom Minex
 Puzzle GIS is a Java Geographic Information Systems (GIS) development platform built on top of the NetBeans Platform.
 AgroSense is an open-source services platform for and by the agricultural sector.
 Gaea+ is a geospatial application offering 3D visualization, manipulation, and analysis of spatial data. The data is pulled from the web using standard Open Geospatial Consortium protocols.
 Integrated Breeding Fieldbook is created by CIMMYT, the International Maize and Wheat Improvement Center in Mexico. It is an easy-to-use tool that helps breeders electronically design field trials and generate fieldbooks and labels through simple wizard-assisted steps.
 Climate Monitor, by EcoSoc at the Maersk Mc-Kinney Moller Institute at the University of Southern Denmark, is a generic platform for analyzing various plant processes, climate factors, and quality of greenhouse plants.
 URSOS is involved in sustainable urban development measurements. It calculate and assess the energy demands in an "urbanization".
 PLCBUS Home Automation uses PLCBUS technology to control hardware devices by using electrical power lines to send data using a specific protocol (PLCBUS protocol).
 EasyTool Professional by Vimar is designed to manage Vimar home automation devices.
 Domito Manager, by MCD Electronics in Poland, configures a system that controls lighting, heating, and opening/closing of gates in houses. In the building sector, a system of this kind is known as an "intelligent home".
 IntelliHome, from Denmark, enables intelligent controlling of every day usages of energy consuming devices, which also brings down overall energy consumption.
 Sweet Home 3D
 Oasis is an application created at the Institute of Marine Research in Bergen, Norway. It is used during research cruises around the world, for recording and analyzing research results.
 Campbell Prediction System (CPS) is used to predict potential fire behavior of a wildland fire.
 Sahranco Water Manager manages the entire pipeline creation and water distribution process, from when plans are being prepared down to following consumer complaints about broken pipes.
 Cismet WMS Client, is a web map service client by Cismet in Saarbrücken, Germany.
 OpenMap Twitter is an application started in China to create a desktop application that integrates OpenMap and Twitter.
 Instant JChem is an OS independent desktop application for scientists who need a tool to manage chemical structures and run queries on local and remote databases. 
 MONGKIE is an integrated network visualization platform for analyzing interconnected biological data in an interactive manner within a knowledge integration environment.
 VESPA is a visual analytics platform for exploring proteogenomics data. VESPA focuses on the integration of peptide-centric proteomics data with other high-throughput, qualitative and quantitative data, such as data from ChIP-seq analyses.
 LRE Analyzer
 Neuroph is a lightweight Java neural network framework for developing common neural network architectures. It provides a well designed, open source Java library with a small number of basic classes that correspond to basic neural network concepts, as well as a neural network editor on top of the NetBeans Platform.
 NBJMol is an open source project for porting JMol to the NetBeans Platform. Primarily, it enables new features to be added to JMol, in the form of plugins. It also gives JMol a windowing system for the first time.
 StarBeans is a generic open-source platform useful in the context of bioinformatics. It provides a minimal NetBeans Platform distribution, together with modules potentially useful in the context of systems biology.
 GenBeans is a rich client platform on top of StarBeans (see above) for bioinformatics, primarily focused on molecular biology and sequence analysis.
 NDVis is an interactive data visualization and analysis tool for large multidimensional databases.
 CRC Press Chemistry Dictionary
 SpectraSuite, by Ocean Optics, is the first modular, OS-independent spectroscopy software platform.
 ChromAUI is an application that is part of the maltcms.sourceforge.net project.
 Glotaran is a tool for global and target analysis of time-resolved spectroscopy and microscopy data. It serves as a graphical user interface (GUI) to the R-package TIMP, which is the computational engine of Glotaran. It works under any operating system that supports Java.
 CyBy2 is a structure-based information management tool used to store and visualize structural data alongside additional information such as project assignment, physical information, spectroscopic data, biological activity, functional data, and synthetic procedures.
 Battelle Bioinformatics Portal, created at the Battelle Memorial Institute, brings together in-house and 3rd party data storage and analysis technologies.
 ChipInspector, by Genomatix, is an analysis program to extract significant information from biological microarrays. Microarrays are fingernail sized plastic or glass chips that laboratories use to measure the activity of genes under specific conditions. ChipInspector calculates statistical scores for millions of signals and puts the result in an up-to-date genomic context.
 GoBean is a GO term enrichment analysis GUI application.
 Climate Design Competition Tool
 PLASMID is a tool for designing plasmid microarrays by using existing mixed microarray data or using virtual microarray data.
 BioCAD is an information fusion software platform. It utilizes local and global optimization for bio-network inference, text mining techniques for network validation and annotation, and Web services-based workflow techniques.
 BioSPICE is a framework that provides biologists access to the most current computational tools.
 Quantitative Biology Tool
 Virtual RatBrain is a tool to visualize 3D cellular and anatomical data of rat brains collected at multiple levels and from multiple brain regions generated in multiple laboratories.
 BiologicalNetworks is a Systems Biology software platform for biological pathways analysis, querying and visualization of gene regulation and protein interaction networks, metabolic and signaling pathways.
 WZL Gear Toolbox, by the Laboratory for Machine Tools and Production Engineering at RWTH Aachen University, is a unified graphical user interface containing different simulation programs for gear applications.
 Cassandra Repository Analyser, by TetradIT, is an automated static analyser for Siebel. It analyses a Siebel repository for best practice violations in configuration and eScript that lead to performance problems, memory leaks, maintenance difficulties and data integrity issues.
 STAR-CCM+, by CD-adapco, delivers the entire computational fluid dynamics (CFD) simulation process in a single integrated software environment.
 Inneo Genius Tools Model Processor is a tool that connects asynchronously to PTC Pro/Engineer and PTC Creo to automatically obtain information and change / process huge amounts of 3D CAD models. It adds or removes layers, parameters and much more.
 TeaCat is a dynamic mathematical application that aims to enable high school students to experiment with and to exercise a variety of mathematical topics. Even engineers may benefit of TeaCat for rather complex calculations, since TeaCat includes working with derivatives, integrals, systems of equations and matrices.
 jCAE an environment for CAE (Computer Aided Engineering) applications. It provides meshing and visualization capabilities and is targeted to run on a maximal number of platforms.
 EasyDoe Toolsuite, by IAV in Berlin, Germany, provides a workflow for control units of calibration engines, using a method called Design of Experiments.
 Silver Solution Studio
 SEC-Viewer is all about the analysis of people counting data from multiple premises simultaneously. It is an application that can collect, analyze and graph count data from various facilities from any PC.
 PowerAgent is a companion product to the CycleOps line of power meters and electronic trainers.
 Pursuit automates much of your competition timing.
 Latiz
 Helmuse, by MZA Technologies, integrates the HELCOMES (High Energy Laser and Consolidated Modeling and Engagement Simulation) legacy software and provides new systems engineering, parameterization and optimization capabilities.
 The SGB (Share Game Board) application, by MZA Technologies, integrates functionality from NASA's World Wind application and utilizes a Latiz model that interacts with MATLAB.
 Exie provides management solutions intended for companies that serve dynamic markets.
 Mercur Business Control
 MultiTrode designs and manufactures pump station controllers, pump station supervisors, liquid level sensors, SCADA software and web-based monitoring and control.
 IVAS is an intelligent virtual agent system. 
 OpenSim
 3D Tooth Manager
 Motasso by SOHARD AG in Switzerland is a medical imaging application for small bowel motility studies.
 Vobium Health Manager
 Klinika Lite EMR caters to the private health care management needs of a patient. It is an application designed to monitor vital statistics, generate reports, archive chart history, and analyze health variables.
 ImageGrid Platform
 MammoControl DIANA, by the Referenzzentrum Mammographie Munster, automatically analyzes and transmits images from constancy test results received via web entry forms for the National Reference Centers in the German Breast Cancer Screening Program. 
 Kebok Aurora Information System is a Pasadena-based company that provides IT services and develops health care management software for psychiatric hospitals. 
 Ordina RIVM Health Data Gatherer
 Nimue Platform is a set of components for building applications relating to motion analysis. This includes a lot of mathematical algorithms for 3D analyses, graphical components for visualization, and also utilities to model the workflow of measurements and analyses.
 Upperlimb is an application developed for the motion lab at the University of Heidelberg. It is focused on upper extremity motion analysis, based on measurement data collected from the marker based Vicon measurement system.
 CMTGait is an application developed for the motion lab at the University of Heidelberg, on top of the Nimue Platform.
 Swedish Bloodbank Management
 Casemix is developed by the Team Of Information Systems Unit, at the Hospital of the University Sains Malaysia. 
 Pharmacist Affiliates Manager is used by the Tunisian National Order of Pharmacists. It manages member affiliations. Members have access to documentation sold by the organization, which is also handled by the application. 
 Argentinian Laboratory Market Analyzer
 Cognative Bayesian Network Architecture IDE
 HEIDE is an IDE for a multiprocessor microcontroller platform named HElabor. The HElabor Multiprocessor Platform is conceived and developed at the Electronic Engineering department of La Sapienza University in Rome, Italy.
 CADET (Corrective Actions and Defect Events Tracking) is an internal application at ON Semiconductor. It collects defect information and is used to plan corrective actions relating to ON Semiconductor production.
 PMC Sierra Validation Test Executor
 PMC Sierra Validation TestBase
 Experian Banking Software provides tools and support for the financial sector, involving tasks such as managing credit risk, fraud prevention, and debt collections. 
 BL Ekonomi by Bjorn Lunden Information AB is an accounting solution created in Sweden.
 WhereWolf is a NetBeans Platform based management console for Sucden Financial's STAR futures and options trading system, built on a scalable service oriented architecture with Java and Jini (Apache River) technology.
 Chartsy is a free, open source stock charting, screening, and trading platform built on the NetBeans Platform.
 SkyRoad Swap Trader provides consolidated real-time analytics for the rates trading complex including CCP, traditional OTC and listed products.
 Elasticia is the Nordic Growth Market's (NGM) next generation trading system.
 Stock Trader Game is an example of the concepts Tom Wheeler covers in his article Building A Complete NetBeans Platform Application.

References

Lists of software
Lists of software add-ons